Agathinai is a 2015 Indian Tamil-language romantic drama film starring  Mahima, Aadukalam Naren and newcomer Varma. The film follows the bond between a father and his daughter.

Plot 
The daughter, Karthika, and her father develop a close relationship after the mother passes away. The daughter falls in love with a man, Ayyanaar, who is also a servant who works for Karthika's family, after he saves her one-day when she falls in a well while riding on her motorcycle. However, the daughter is engaged to another man. Whom she marries and the issues that arise forms the rest of the story.

Cast 
Source

 Mahima as Karthika
 Aadukalam Naren as Karthika's father
 Varma as Ayyanaar 
 G. M. Kumar as Ayyanaar's father
 Nalini as Vishnu's mother
 Rajashree
 Senthi Kumari as Deivanai
 Bhuvitha
 Revathi Paati
 T. R. Srikanth as Adhilingam
 Ramachandran Durairaj
 Benito as Vishnu
 Black Pandi as Vishnu's friend
 George Maryan as Muthaiah
 Swaminathan as Mani
 Halwa Vasu as Chokka
 Funk Ravi
 Sivanarayanamoorthy
 Lollu Sabha Manohar
 Pakoda Pandi as Ayanaru's friend
 Selvakumar
 Odumalai Ravi
 Namitha Marimuthu as Kilipula

Production 
The film is directed by Maruthu, who previously was a director for the television series Athipookal. Actor Varma and Mahima and Aadukalam Naren  were signed to enact the lead roles.
 The film is a love story that is intended to be family friendly since the film is sans inappropriate content. Mahima plays Naren's daughter in the film, which is set in a village near Karaikudi. Varma made his film debut with this film.

Soundtrack 
The songs were composed by Maria Manohar. All of the songs from the film were written by Vairamuthu.
"Thanthaiyum Neeye, Thaai Madi Neeye" - Maria Manohar, Sruthi Jeyamoorthy
"Ilaigalile Sadugudu Nadathuthu" - Maria Manohar, Shakthisree Gopalan
"Adiye Kadhaliye" - Maria Manohar, Haricharan
"Munthaanai Selakulle" - Maria Maonhar, Velmurugan, Akshaya

Release 
A critic from The New Indian Express wrote that "With very few moments to relish, the film is an average entertainer". A critic from Maalai Malar praised the performances of the lead cast, the story, the music, and the cinematography. A critic from iFlicks opined that "Having chosen a casual village story director U.P.Maruthu has roped in a perfect cast but he could have concentrated more on the climax".

References

External links 

Indian romantic drama films
2010s Tamil-language films